The Nicking House is a historic building located in Iowa City, Iowa, United States.  Henry C. Nicking, who was a barber, had this house built in 1854.  It is one of the oldest houses in the city, and one of a very few that was constructed using sandstone.  The general architectural style is a stripped-down version of the Greek Revival style, but a rear addition gives it a saltbox appearance. It features a symmetrical facade, side gable roof,    limestone lintels and window sills, and cornice returns on the front.  The house was listed on the National Register of Historic Places in 1975.

References

Houses completed in 1854
Vernacular architecture in Iowa
Houses in Iowa City, Iowa
National Register of Historic Places in Iowa City, Iowa
Houses on the National Register of Historic Places in Iowa